Surjya Kanta Hazarika  is an Assamese litterateur, an eminent scholar, author, publisher, playwright, lyricist, composer, cultural activist, feature film and documentary maker, social worker and philanthropist. Hazarika is a recipient of the Padma Shri Award in 2008 for his contribution to Literature & Education. He is the current president of Asam Sahitya Sabha.

Birth 
Dr. Surjya Kanta Hazarika  was born on 31 May 1956 in Dibrugarh in a cultured family. His father was Chandrakanta Hazarika and mother was Labanya Hazarika. Chandrakanta Hazarika was a teacher by profession but he had also established a publication house named “Bani Mandir” in 1949 which became an elite publication house of Assam within a short span of time. Surjya Kanta Hazarika was the eldest of his sons and the second among the seven children – three sons and four daughters.

Education 
After finishing his school education in Dibrugarh and Digboi, he got enrolled for Pre-University Classes at Gauhati Commerce College, Guwahati in 1973-74. But after one year he had to go to Dibrugarh to look after family publication business and completed his PU from DHSK Commerce College in Dibrugarh. In 1978 he completed B.Com. from the same college. He got M.Com. degree from Dibrugarh University in 1980. After this he started pursuing Ph.D. in Gauhati University but could not finish it because of being too pre-occupied with newspaper publication activities. However, in 2016 he started pursuing Ph.D. again from Mahapurush Srimanta Sankaradeva University, Nagaon. Initially, he started his research under the guidance of Dr. Pradip Hazarika but after his untimely death he resumed his research work under Dr. Karabi Deka Hazarika and finished it in 2021. His research topic was ‘Publication of Assam related books in the 19th century: A survey.‘ This thesis has been published as a book and is a valuable treasure of information for those who study the history of Assamese language and literature.

As an author 
From an early age Surjya Kanta Hazarika started to write. When he was in ninth standard, he wrote about a Delhi trip in a popular weekly newspaper Asom Bani. His first  book ‘Siku Aaha Nana Katha’ (Let’s Learn Many Things)  was published in 1975 when he was just twenty. From an early age he edited several magazines including the college magazines. He had edited a handwritten magazine ‘Jyotirupa’ in 1976.

Right from the time when he was in his early twenties Surjya Kanta Hazarika has been actively taking forward his family legacy of book publication and printing. Contributing immensely to Assamese book publishing industry and literature in general, he had established Chandrakanta Press Pvt. Ltd. in Guwahati in 1987. He had shifted his base to Guwahati two years earlier in 1985. He had a big dream of publishing a daily news paper. On 1 January 1988 he started publishing an Assamese News Paper named ‘Natun Dainik’. ‘Natun Dainik’ had soon become a very popular news paper under the editorship of Chandra Prasad Saikia, Jatindra Kumar Borgohain and Dr. Rohini Kumar Barua(a retired IAS) and later Surjya Kanta Hazarika himself took the editorship of the newspaper in 1993-94 and 1997-99.

As a publisher 
As a publisher of news papers, Surjya Kanta Hazarika had introduced a few revolutionary concepts in Assamese news paper industry. He had introduced ‘Sandhya Batori’, an evening newspaper in 1989. ‘Chitra Sangbad’ a niche news paper dedicated  to cinema and cultural acitivities in 1990 and a sports news paper ‘Khel Sangbad’ in 1992. Khel Sangbad was published under his own editorship. Apart from these four newspapers, he brought out a fortnightly newspaper named ‘Bahniman’ from Dibrugarh. He had also published another magazine named ‘Pratidhwani’ with Dr. Bhupen Hazarika as the editor and himself as the Associate Editor.

Surjya Kanta Hazarika was only twenty when his association with ‘Asam Sahitya Sabha’ started. Since then he has been an active member of the ‘Asam Sahitya Sabha’. In 1980 he had taken the responsibility of Assistant Secretary of Dibrugarh Sahitya Sabha. He had also edited the news paper ‘Asam Sahitya Sabha Sangbad’ published by the Asam Sahitya Sabha in 1993. He was the editor of  ‘Asam Sahitya Sabha Patrika(Viswakosh Edition)’ in 2003.  In 1993-94, 2001–03, 2010–12, 2012-14 he was a member of the Executive Committee of the Asam Sahitya Sabha.

Dr. Surjya Kanta Hazarika has published thousands of valuable books under the banner of ‘Bani Mandir’ and ‘S. H. Educational Trust’. He has also encouraged many new authors. He himself has written and edited many valuable books. In order to preserve the legacy of Assamese literature he has also reprinted many age-old books which are considered immensely valuable.

Dr. Surjya Kanta Hazarika has been associated with many prestigious organisations in various capacities including the All Assam Book Sellers & Publishers’ Association, as the President for the period of 2005-06 & 2006-07. He is also the adviser of All Assam Printers’ Association. During this time he took many steps to promote Assamese publishing industry at the national and international level.

One of the most valuable works of Dr. Surjya Kanta Hazarika is the transcription of Multi-faceted Dr. Bhupen Hazarika’s autobiography ‘Moi Eti Jajabor’.

As a lyricist/composer 
As a lyricist/composer, Dr. Surjya Kanta Hazarika has contributed significantly to the world of Assamese music. In 1987 he became an approved lyricist of All India Radio, Dibrugarh. Later All India Radio, Guwahati had also recognized him as an approved lyricist. He has written and composed songs for various audio albums, TV serials, movies and documentaries. ‘Brikodar Baruar Biya’, ‘Tore More Alokore Jatra’, ‘Ananya Prantar’, ‘Bahuttor Majot Ekotto’, ‘Ghar Sangsar’, ‘Merpak’, ‘Roopkonwar Jyotiprasad Agarwala’, ‘Rupantarar Silpi Jyotiprasad’ , ‘Jyotiprasad: A Legend of the Northeast (English)’ etc. are some of the TV serials for which he wrote songs. He has produced several audio albums. Most significant among these are – ‘Shrabya Safura’, ‘Asta Mukuta (Dr. Surjya Kanta Hazarika’s lyrics and Dr. Bhupen Hazarika’s composition & vocals), ‘Borluit’, ‘Jyoti Prasad’, ‘Harinam Loboloi (devotional)’, ‘Dholor Sewe Sewe (Bihu)’, ‘Adhyatmik Dr. Bhupen Hazarika’ and ‘O Mur Aponar Desh’.

As a producer/director 
Dr. Surjya Kanta Hazarika has produced & directed many TV serials, documentaries and has acted in several serials, movies, plays etc. Assamese TV serial ‘Brikodar Baruar Biya’, produced and directed by Dr. Hazarika was one of the most super hit and iconic Assamese TV serials of all times. It was telecast by Doordarshan Kendra, Guwahati. Apart from this, he directed and prduced 9 other TV Serials namely Nirmal Bhakat, Ananya Prantar, Noi Boi Jai, Tore More Alokore Jatra, Maharathi, Dhanya Nara Tanu Bhal, The North East Today, The North East Round-up etc., 18 documentaries namely Chira Senehi Mor Bhasa Janani, Namghare Namghare, Shrimanta Sankardev aru Brindaboni Vastra, Sahityarathi Lakshminath Bezbarua, Rupantoror Shilpi Jyotiprashad, Bihangam Drishtit Bishnu Prashad Rabha, Bihangam Drishtit Dr. Bhupen Hazarika, Dr. Bhupen Hazarika : a living legend, Asom Ratna Dr. Bhupen Hazarika, Bahuttar Majot Ekotto, Jawahar Rojgar Yojana, Grammunayan: Mahila aru Shishu, Jyotiprashad: a legend for the North East, Kalaguru Bishnu Prashad Rabha, Mother and Child Healthcare, Places of Tourist Attraction in Assam, In search of a Lost City of Pragjyotishpur , 1 telefilm named Mitrashya Chakushya in Hindi and has assisted in the direction of a TV serial named ‘Bor Luitor Pare Pare’. Apart from that he has also acted in several TV serials, radio and stage plays as well as movies.

He produced and directed a full-length feature film name ‘Shrimanta Sankaradeva’ depicting the life and works of Shrimanta Sankaradeva, a 15th century Assamese Vaishnavite saint, social reformer and cultural icon.

Dr. Surjya Kanta Hazarika has also been recognized with many prestigious awards including the ‘Padmashri’ in 2008.

Notable works

Books 
‘Dr. William Carey, Atmaram Sarma Aru Asamiya Bhashar Pratham Chapa Grantha Dharmapustak’ (Dr. William Carey, Atmaram Sarma and the first Assamese Printed Book ‘Dharmapustak’) 2017:

‘Dharmapustak’ was the first Assamese printed book published by American Missionaries in 1813. It was the Assamese translation of the Bible done by Atmaram Sarma at the initiative of British Missionary Dr. William Carey.  Dr. Surjya Kanta Hazarika has documented important aspects related to the publishing of the book which was a very significant event in the development of modern Assamese publishing industry as well as Assamese literature.

Asamor Jatiyo Sangeet Aru Itihaas (The State Anthem of Assam and Its History), 2016:

This research oriented book highlights the historical significance of ‘O Mur Aponar Desh’, the state anthem of Assam.

Anya Ek Dristikonere Sahityarathi Lakshminath Bezbaroa (Sahityarathi Lakshminath Bezbarua  from A Different Perspective) 2019:

Sahityarathi Lakshminath Bezbarua, one of the stalwarts of Assamese literature and culture played a very significant role in the crusade against attempts to deprive Assamese language of its independent identity. His contribution to the field of literature and society is immense and Dr. Surjya Kanta Hazarika, through this 403 page book, Dr. Hazarika is trying to explore some lesser highlighted yet significant aspects of Bezbarua’s persona and his contribution to Assamese society and culture.

Sahityarathi Lakshminath Bezbaruar Sangbadikota (Sahityrathi Lakshminath Bezbarua’s Journalism) 2021:

Sahityarathi Lakshminath Bezbarua was one of the stalwarts of Assamese literature and language. He was one of the pioneers of the struggle for the identity of Assamese language. Apart from his role in literature and culture, he was also one of the pioneers in Assamese journalism. Bezbarua gave birth to a new era in Assamese literature and journalism as the editor of newspapers ‘Jonaki’ and ‘Bahi’. These magazines, in fact, were the platforms that nourished and catapulted many Assamese authors and journalists who became famous later. Dr. Surjya Hazarika explores these aspects of Bezbarua in this book.

Unabingsha Satikat Prakashita Asomar Grantha Itihas (The history of  Books on Assam Printed and Published during 19th Century from different Places of Assam, India and Abroad):

This well researched and well documented book is definitely a treasure of Assamese literature and academia. Apart from books on literature, culture, history & heritage etc. Dr. Hazarika has also covered the books on geography, mathematics, dictionaries and even school textbooks published in the period between 1801 to 1900. The book encompasses the detailed description of the process of making blocks for Assamese printing press and historical facts related to the setting up of the printing press in Assam. This book is  a valuable historical document related to evolution of Assamese printing and publishing industry also.

Bhupendar Xoite Xannidhyar Kisu Mitha Sowaran (Sweet Reminiscence of Dr. Bhupen Hazarika’s Association) 2022:

This coffee table book, which includes many rare photographs, highlights the moments of interactions between Dr. Bhupen Hazarika and Dr. Surjya Kanta Hazarika during their 40 years long association.

Other books- 
Spiritual/Religious books edited by Dr. Surjya Kanta Hazarika

 Kirtan Ghosha Aru Naam Ghosha (Kirtan Ghosha & Naam Ghosha) 2003
 Chari Shastra (Four scriptures- Kirtan Ghosha, Naam Ghosha, Bhakti Ratnavali and Dasam together) 2006
 Sri Madbhagawat ( complete Bhagawat with introduction) , 2014
 Srimanta Sankaradeva Bakyamrit (Complete works of Srimanta Sankaradeva), 2014
 Sri Sri Madbhabdev Bakyamrit (Complete works of Sri Sri Madhabdeva), 2015
 Sachitra Kirtan Ghosha(Illustrated Manuscript of Kirtan Ghosa), 2016
 Sachitra Bhakti Ratnavali(Illustrated Manuscript of Bhakti Ratnavali), 2016
 Sachitra Srimad-Bhagawat ( 8th chapter)(Illustrated Manuscript of Srimad-Bhagawata), 2016
 Sachitra Srimad-Bhagawat ( 11th Chapter)(Illustrated Manuscript of Srimad-Bhagawata), 2016
 Sachitra Banamalideva Charit,(Illustrated Manuscript of Banamalideva Charit), 2016
 Chitra Bhagawat, (Illustrated Manuscript of Bhagawat),2017
 Sachitra Kirtan Ghosha,(Illustrated Manuscript of Kirtan Ghosa), Kathbapu Satra Edition,2022
 Sachitra Kirtan Ghosha,(Illustrated Manuscript of Kirtan Ghosa), Na-Burka Satra Edition,2022
 Sachitra Kirtan Ghosha , (Illustrated Manuscript of Kirtan Ghosa), British Museum Edition, 2022
 Sachitra Aadi Dasam,(Illustrated Manuscript of Srimad-Bhagavat’s 10th Canto),2022
 Parijat Haran Naat, 2017
 Ram Vijay Naat, 2018
 Keligopal Naat, 2019
 Saptakanda Ramayan, 2022

Compiled & Edited Books on various topics 

 Bhupen Hazarikar Geet Samagra (Songs of Dr. Bhupen Hazarika), 1993
 Adhunik Asamiya Biswakosh, 1994
 Rasaraj Lakhsminath Bezbaruar Sishu Sahitya Sambhar, 2006
 Books From Assam ( An introductory catalogue of 68 Assamese Books), 2006
 Sahityacharya Atul Chandra Hazarika Sishu Sahitya Sambhar ( 1st, 2nd and 3rd volume) 2007
 Bhupen Hazarika Rchanawali ( 1st, 2nd and 3rd volume), 2008
 Bhinnojonor Drsitit Bishnuprasad Rabha ( Compilation of more than 200 articles), 2008
 Moi Eti Jajabor ( Dr. Bhupen Hazarika’s Transcripted Autobiography) 2008
 Dharmapustak (Reprint of the first Assamese book printed in 1813), 2012
 A Catalogue of Manuscripts Preserved at The Srimanta Shankardev Kalakshetra, 2018
 The Wandering Minstrel Dr. Bhupen Hazarika: A Jewel in the Crown of the Nation

Magazines Edited 

 Asam Sahitya Sabha Sangbad, 1993
 Asam Sahitya Sabha Patrika, 2003
 Jyotirupa (Handwritten magazine edited during his student life), 1976–77
 Pratidhwani, (Associated Editor for the magazine edited by Dr. Bhupen Hazarika), 1985-90

Souvenirs Edited 

 Souvenir of Assamese Film Festival held in Dibrugarh, 1980
 Souvenir of the presentation ceremony of the Assam Ratna award given to Dr. Bhupen Hazaika by Government of Assam
 Souvenir of Srimanta Sankaradeva International Festival, 2016
 Souvenir to mark the 20th anniversary of the Srimanta Sankaradeva Kalakshetra, 2019
 Souvenir of Guwahati Literary Festival, 2012

Newspapers & magazines edited 

 Natun Dainik, editor (1993–94, 1997–98), total 3 years
 Sandhya Batori, Editor- (1989–96), 8 years
 Chitra Sangbad, Editor, (1990-2000), 11 years
 Khel Sangbad, Editor, (fortnightly sports news paper in Assamese), 1 year
 Bahniman, editor ( fortnightly newspaper) 1978-79, 2 years

Dictionaries 

 Byabaharik Asamiya Abhidhan- Dr. Basanta Kumar Goswami
 Biparitarthak Sabdar Abhidhan- Dr. Basanta Kumar Goswami

Feature film
Srimanta Sankardeva  (2010)

Documentraies

Research based- 

 Siro Senehi Mur Bhasha Janani
 Srimanta Shankardev Aru Brindabani Bastra
 Asam Rtana Dr. Bhupen Hazarika

Biographical- 

 Sahityarathi Lakshminath Bezbarua
 Rupantarar Silpi Jyotiprasad
 Bihangam Dristit Bishnuprasad Rabha
 Bihangam Dristit Dr. Bhupen Hazarika
 Dr. Bhupen Hazarika: A Living Legend
 Syed Abdul Malik: Ek Byaktigata Sannidhyar Madhur Sowaran
 Jyotiprasad: A Legend of The North-East
 Kalaguru Bishnu Prasad Rabha

Director of TV serials

TV serials 

 Brikodar Baruar Biya
 Nirmal Bhakat
 Ananya Prantar
 Noi Boi Jai
 Tore More Alokore Jatra
 Moharothi
 Dhanya Nara Tanu Bhal

References 

1956 births
Recipients of the Padma Shri in literature & education
People from Dibrugarh district
Assamese-language film directors
20th-century Indian dramatists and playwrights
20th-century Indian film directors
Film directors from Assam
20th-century Indian male writers
Living people